() is a Japanese manufacturer of power tools.  Founded on March 21, 1915, it is based in Anjō, Japan and operates factories in Brazil, China, Japan, Mexico, Romania, the United Kingdom, Germany, United Arab Emirates, Thailand, Canada, and the United States. Annual sales were equivalent to $3.1 billion in 2012.

History 
In March 1915, Mosaburo Makita (b. 1893) founded Makita Electric Works in Nagoya, Aichi, Japan and began selling and repairing lighting equipment, motors and transformers. In 1958, Makita marketed a portable electrical planer in Japan and became a manufacturer of power tools the following year. In April 1969, they introduced the 6500D battery-powered drill (the first rechargeable power tool).  In December 1978, they launched the 6010D rechargeable drill (the first nickel cadmium battery tool).  In August 1997, the 6213D rechargeable driver-drill was exhibited at the Chicago Hardware Show (the first nickel hydride battery tool).  In February 2005, the TD130D (the first lithium-ion battery tool) was made available.

Makita ships many of its power tools in Systainer-compatible stacking boxes.  In 2011 Makita registered a design for its own "Makpac" variant in the names of Yuji Yamamoto and Kiyozumi Kokawa.

Products
The products sold by Makita around the world can be subdivided into the following categories.

Cordless tools
Makita offers many products in this area. In addition to cordless screwdrivers, cordless impact wrenches, cordless rotary hammers drills and cordless jigsaws, Makita offers various other tools such as battery saws, cordless angle grinders, cordless planers, cordless metal shears, battery-powered screwdrivers, cordless slot mills and even a coffee maker.

Power tools
In the field of power tools, Makita offers classic tools (drilling and stemming hammers, drills, planers, saws, cutting and angle grinders), gardening equipment (electric lawnmowers, high-pressure cleaners, blowers), and measuring tools (rangefinders, rotating lasers).

Petrol equipment
Makita develops cutters, power generators, chainsaws, scythes, lawnmowers , blowers and grass trimmers in this division.

Cordless tool batteries
Makita created the 18V lithium-ion cordless tool battery in 2005.

Makita launched the XGT 40Vmax line in 2020 which runs at a nominal voltage of 36V.

Accessories
Makita manufactures many accessories for their tools like batteries and chargers for cordless tools. Blades and tables are manufactured for sawing tools. Moreover, carrying cases are also manufactured by Makita to easily carry tools to the worksite.

References

External links 
 

 Makita
Power tool manufacturers
Companies based in Aichi Prefecture
Companies listed on the Tokyo Stock Exchange
Japanese brands
Japanese companies established in 1915
Manufacturing companies established in 1915
Multinational companies headquartered in Japan
Anjō, Aichi